Santiago–Tuguegarao Road is a major national primary road in the provinces of Cagayan, Kalinga, and Isabela in the Philippines. It is a bypass road of the Pan-Philippine Highway, also known as Cagayan Valley Road, connecting to the cities of Tuguegarao and Santiago.

The road is designated as National Route 51 (N51) of the Philippine highway network.

History

Route description

Santiago to Cabatuan 
Santiago–Tuguegarao Road starts at Mabini Junction, a roundabout intersection with Maharlika Highway and R.C. Miranda Road in Barangay Mabini, Santiago City. Heading north, it then runs straight to the north where it traverses the municipalities of Ramon, San Mateo, and Cabatuan in Isabela.

Cabatuan to Santa Maria 
At the poblacion of Cabatuan, the road turns north at its intersection with Santiago–Tuguegarao Bypass Road, where the Triangle Park is situated. It then crosses the Magat River vis Magat Bridge and traverses the municipalities of Aurora, San Manuel, Roxas, Mallig, and Quezon in Isabela before entering the province of Kalinga. In Kalinga, it traverses the lowland municipalities of Tabuk, the province's capital, and Rizal, away from their poblacions. It then re-enters Isabela and traverses the municipalities of Santo Tomas and Santa Maria.

Santa Maria to Tuguegarao 

In Santa Maria, Isabela, the road makes a sharp left turn at its intersection with Cabagan–Santa Maria Road. It then enters the province of Cagayan and traverses the municipalities of Enrile and Solana, where it turns east at its intersection with Cagayan–Apayao Road. It crosses the Cagayan River through the Buntun Bridge and enters the city of Tuguegarao. Approaching the poblacion, it assumes local street names such as Luna Extension and Luna Street, respectively. At its intersection with Rizal Street, west of the Tuguegarao Cathedral, it turns north and assumes such local street name. It then turns northeast towards the Balzain Bridge II and becomes Balzain Highway. The road ends at the Tuguegarao Junction, a roundabout intersection with Maharlika Highway (Cagayan Valley Road) and Tuguegarao Diversion Road II.

Intersections

Santiago–Tuguegarao Bypass Road 

The Santiago–Tuguegarao Bypass Road is short bypass of Santiago–Tuguegarao Road in Cabatuan, Isabela. This bypass road is designated as National Route 53 (N53) of the Philippine highway network. It connects Cabatuan, Luna and Cauayan.

References 

Roads in Cagayan
Roads in Kalinga (province)
Roads in Isabela (province)